Teresa Janina Kierocińska (religious name - Mother Maria Teresa of St. Joseph; 14 June 1885 - 12July 1946) was a Carmelite sister born in Wieluń, who cofounded the Convent of Carmelite Sisters of the Infant Jesus and was honored with the title of the Righteous Among the Nations.

Life
She finished high school in Wieluń. Janina felt the need for total devotion to God on the day of her First Holy Communion but she couldn’t follow her call because of the refusal of the family, especially her father. At home she led a life of prayer, deep devotion, self-denial and love towards her neighbors. During her adolescence she came to know the works of Saint Teresa of Jesus which were a great influence in her spiritual life.

From 1909, Anzelm Gądek, a Servant of God and a Discalced Carmelite, became her spiritual guide. It was he who founded the first active-contemplative Congregation of the Carmelite Sisters of the Child Jesus, on 31 December 1921.

Ministry
Janina became the first mother superior and a co-founder of the Congregation. From that time on, as Mother Teresa of St. Joseph, she started her service to God and people, poorest both in moral and material sense, in the district of Sosnowiec.

She had been the superior of the congregation for 25 years, till the day of her death. She followed the constitution of the congregation forming the life of the sisters in the spirit of the Divine Childhood and apostolic and charitable work among the poor. She had a special veneration to the Infant Jesus, Holy Eucharist, the most Holy Face of Jesus, Our Lady of Mt Carmel, and St. Joseph.

During the Second World War, she showed heroic courage saving many young girls from deportation to Germany by hiding them in the cloister. She helped refugees, soldiers of the Home Army, organized an orphanage and a canteen for the poor, and taught them clandestinely. In 1992, she was posthumously honored by Yad Vashem in Jerusalem as Righteous Among the Nations for saving Jewish refugees.

After the Second World War, she was actively involved in new tasks of the Catholic Church in Poland. The people of Zagłębie district considered her to be simply their Mother. The sisters of the congregation taught catechism in the schools, ran a kindergarten and performed works of charity.

Death
She died on 12 July 1946 in Sosnowiec. The process of her cause towards sainthood in the Archdiocese of Częstochowa lasted from 1983-88. In May 2013, Pope Francis signed the decree of her heroic virtues. Her remains are found in the church of her congregation in Sosnowiec (ul. Matki Teresy Kierocińskiej 25).

External links
 Teresa Janina Kierocińska – her activity to save Jews' lives during the Holocaust, at Yad Vashem website

References

1885 births
1946 deaths
1921 establishments in Poland
1921 in Christianity
Polish Servants of God
Venerated Carmelites
Polish people of World War II
Polish Righteous Among the Nations
Women in World War II
20th-century Polish Roman Catholic nuns
People from Wieluń
Venerated Catholics by Pope Francis